The Synagogue of Reggio Emilia or the Sinagoga di Reggio Emilia is located on the Via dell'Aquila of Reggio Emilia, in the region of Emilia Romagna, in Italy. living in the Grand Duchy of Tuscany in 1848.

History 
A synagogue was located at the site since 1672; the Jewish community had been confined to a ghetto in this area. While the papacy called for establishment of a ghetto in 1555, during the regency of Duchess Martinozzi, Duke Alfonso IV's widow, this rule was enforced. Jews had to live within the streets San Rocco, Caggiati, della Volta, dell'Aquila, Monzermone. This synagogue was rebuilt to replace the prior building; it was designed by Pietro Marchelli in 1849 and competed by 1856. The building was heavily damaged by allied bombings of World War II. The Jewish community of Reggio was decimated during after the War and Holocaust, and the furniture and the beautiful carved marble Torah ark were transferred to the synagogue Kirit Shmu ‘el in Haifa. The building, for a time used as a printing house, became dilapidated. In 2008, a partial restoration of the interior took place, and the building is used for cultural exhibits.

References

Buildings and structures in Reggio Emilia
Neoclassical architecture in Emilia-Romagna
Synagogues completed in 1856
Synagogues in Italy